The Chai Wan Mosque or Cape Collinson Mosque is a mosque in Chai Wan, Hong Kong, China. It is the fifth mosque built in Hong Kong.

History
To compensate the resumption of cemetery and a small mosque in Ho Man Tin in 1963, the British Hong Kong government provided a land for cemetery in Cape Collinson and constructed a small mosque called the Chai Wan Mosque which was opened on 4 August 1963 and was primarily used to offer funeral prayer. Initially regular prayers were not held there because the mosque was located in a very isolated area and no Muslims lived there except for a caretaker. However, as more and more Muslim families settled in Chai Wan, they started to perform their daily prayers at the mosque. The Incorporated Trustees of the Islamic Community Fund of Hong Kong had also renovated the entire building in 2005 and air conditioners had been installed in the main prayer hall.

On 17 May 2010, the Advisory Board of Antiquities and Monuments Office designated the mosque as a Grade III historic building.

Architecture
The mosque main space is mainly devoted to three prayer halls with luxurious white marble finishing. Outside the prayer hall is an open space suitable for small religious gatherings.

Transportation
The mosque is accessible within walking distance South West from Chai Wan station of the MTR.

See also
 Islam in Hong Kong
 List of mosques in Hong Kong

References

External links

 Antiquities Advisory Board. Historic Building Appraisal. Cape Collinson Muslim Cemetery & Mosque Pictures of the mosque Pictures of the cemetery

1963 establishments in Hong Kong
Chai Wan
Mosques completed in 1963
Mosques in Hong Kong